"Nintendo hard" refers to extreme difficulty in video games, characterized by trial-and-error gameplay and limited or nonexistent saving of progress. It originated with the Nintendo Entertainment System in the 1980s and 1990s, such as with Contra (1988), Ninja Gaiden (1988), and Battletoads (1991). Its usage has continued since.

History
The Nintendo hard difficulty of many games released for the Nintendo Entertainment System (NES) was influenced by the popularity of arcade games in the mid-1980s, a period where players put countless coins in machines trying to beat a game that was brutally hard yet very enjoyable. The difficulty of many games released in the 1980s and 1990s has also been attributed to the hardware limitations affecting gameplay. Former Nintendo president Satoru Iwata said in an interview regarding how NES games were made: "Everyone involved in the production would spend all night playing it, and because they made games, they became good at them. So these expert gamers make the games, saying 'This is too easy'". Also, Damiano Gerli of Ars Technica observed that extreme difficulty made it possible for a game with little actual content (in terms of number of levels or opponents) to provide a long period of gameplay: "Brutal challenges make a relative dearth of original content last longer."

The number of games considered Nintendo hard decreased significantly with the fourth-generation 16-bit period of video gaming. Later Nintendo hard games include Super Star Wars (1992). According to Michael Enger, indie games like I Wanna Be the Guy (2007) and Super Meat Boy (2010) are an "obvious homage" to the Nintendo hard games of the NES era, labeled as "masocore".

Analysis
Arcade conversions and 2D platformers are commonly called Nintendo hard. The Houston Press described the Nintendo hard era as a period where games "universally felt like they hated us for playing them". GamesRadar journalist Maxwell McGee noted the variety of types of "Nintendo hard" games in the NES library: "A game can be difficult because it's genuinely hard, or because it demands you finish the entire adventure in one sitting. It can litter the playing field with spikes and bottomless pits ... or be so hopelessly obtuse you have no idea how to advance". He also wrote that several NES games, such as Yo! Noid (1990), Silver Surfer (1990), and Teenage Mutant Ninja Turtles (1989) garnered their Nintendo hard difficulty "for all the wrong reasons". Journalist Michael Enger did not qualify games with challenges that came from poorly-done gameplay as Nintendo hard, but rather only games that were well made and replayable but still extremely hard.

Examples
The games in the following list have been recognized as being some of the hardest NES games and for some, all platforms.

The Adventures of Bayou Billy (1988)
Air Fortress (1987)
Atlantis no Nazo (1986)
Batman (1990)
Battletoads (1991)
Bionic Commando (1988)
Blaster Master (1988)
Bubble Bobble (1988)
Castlequest (1986)
Castlevania (1986)
Castlevania III: Dracula's Curse (1989)
Conflict (1989)
Contra (1988)
Cybernoid (1989)
Déjà Vu (1988)
Die Hard (1991)

Double Dragon III: The Sacred Stones (1991)
Dr. Jekyll and Mr. Hyde (1988)
Fester's Quest (1989)
Final Fantasy (1987)
Friday the 13th (1989)
Ghosts 'n Goblins (1985)
Gradius (1986)
The Guardian Legend (1988)
The Karate Kid (1987)
Kid Icarus (1986)
Legacy of the Wizard (1987)
Little Nemo: The Dream Master (1989)
Mega Man (1987), described by USgamer as an "introduction" of Nintendo hard difficulty
Mega Man 3 (1990)
Milon's Secret Castle (1986)

Ninja Gaiden (1988)
Ninja Gaiden II: The Dark Sword of Chaos (1990)
Ninja Gaiden III: The Ancient Ship of Doom (1991)
Punch-Out!! (1987)
Recca (1992)
Shadowgate (1989)
Silver Surfer (1990)
Solomon's Key (1986)
Starship Hector (1987)
Super Contra (1990)
Super Mario Bros.: The Lost Levels (1986)
Takeshi no Chōsenjō (1986)
Teenage Mutant Ninja Turtles (1989)
The Simpsons: Bart vs. the Space Mutants (1991)
Top Gun (1987)
Uninvited (1989)
Yo! Noid (1990)
Zelda II: The Adventure of Link (1987)

References

Nintendo Entertainment System
Video game culture